Brachydiplax sobrina is a species of dragonfly in the family Libellulidae. It is native to Bangladesh, India, Myanmar, Nepal, Sri Lanka, and Thailand.

Description and habitat
It is a small dragonfly with dark-brown eyes. Its thorax is yellowish-brown, with black metallic markings. All marks are  obscured by bluish-white pruinescence in adults. Abdomen is black on dorsum, marked with broad yellow spots on the sides in sub-adults and tenerals. All the marks are obscured by blue pruinescence in adults. Female is similar to the teneral male. 

It breeds in marshes, ditches, and ponds.

References

External links

Libellulidae
Insects described in 1842